Musa Ali Isah (born 26 August 2000) is a Nigerian-born Bahraini athlete. He competed in the mixed 4 × 400 metres relay event at the 2019 World Athletics Championships, winning the bronze medal.

References

External links
 

2000 births
Living people
Bahraini male sprinters
Place of birth missing (living people)
World Athletics Championships athletes for Bahrain
Athletes (track and field) at the 2018 Asian Games
World Athletics Championships medalists
Asian Games competitors for Bahrain
Islamic Solidarity Games medalists in athletics